is the Japanese word for "deity"

Kami-sama may also refer to:
 , the ruler of Heaven and Earth in Oh My Goddess!
 Kami-sama (Saiyuki), a character who is a servant to Ukoku Sanzo/Dr. Nii Jianyi in the manga Saiyuki
 , the deity who rules over the galactic system which surrounds Earth in the manga Dr. Slump 
 , a deity in Dragon Ball who is the God of Earth
 Kamisama (novel), a 1994 novel by Hiromi Kawakami

See also
 Kami (disambiguation)